Kallur is a census town in Khammam district in the Indian state of Telangana.

Geography
It has an average elevation of 104 metres (341 feet). Very near to Andhra Pradesh state capital Amaravathi, and vijayawada.it is near to Rajahmundry and Eluru towns in AP. Kallur is also border for ts and ap states .

Demographics
 India census, Kallur had a population of 55,880. Males constitute 51% of the population and females 49%. Kallur has an average literacy rate of 43%, lower than the national average of 59.5%: male literacy is 54%, and female literacy is 32%. In Kallur, 14% of the population is under 6 years of age.

References
3. Chowdary mess kallur famous food hotel.

Cities and towns in Khammam district
Tourist attractions in Khammam district

4. Heritage foods limited. dairy and milk processing unit at kallur 

5. kakatiya cement sugar industry limited at kallur.